Mitchell Barnett (born February 23, 1993) is a former professional Canadian football linebacker. He was drafted 59th overall in the 2016 CFL Draft by the Hamilton Tiger-Cats and signed with the team on May 27, 2016. After two seasons and 29 games with the Tiger-Cats, he signed as a free agent with the BC Lions on February 13, 2018. He retired from professional football on February 11, 2021.

He played NCAA football with the Simon Fraser Clan from 2013 to 2014 before transferring to the UBC Thunderbirds football program for the 2015 CIS football season where he was part of the 51st Vanier Cup championship team.

Personal life
Barnett's father, Bruce Barnett, played for the Lions from 1985 to 1986 and was part of the Lions' 73rd Grey Cup victory in 1985.

References

External links
BC Lions bio 

1993 births
Living people
BC Lions players
Canadian football linebackers
Hamilton Tiger-Cats players
Players of Canadian football from British Columbia
Simon Fraser Clan football players
Sportspeople from North Vancouver
UBC Thunderbirds football players